John William Hiscock (1 March 1924 – 28 May 2007) was an Australian rules footballer who played with Melbourne in the Victorian Football League (VFL).

Notes

References

External links 
 
 
 Jack Hiscock, at The VFA Project.

1924 births
2007 deaths
Australian rules footballers from Melbourne
Melbourne Football Club players
Sandringham Football Club players
People from Brighton, Victoria